Hathway is a surname. Notable people with the surname include:

Alan Hathway (1906–1977), American writer
Kevin Hathway, British classical percussionist and educator
Reginald Hathway (1907–?), Welsh rugby union and rugby league footballer
Ted Hathway, English footballer